Crashing the Water Barrier is a 1956 American short documentary film directed by Konstantin Kalser. It won an Oscar at the 29th Academy Awards in 1957 for Best Short Subject (One-Reel).  It focuses on Donald Campbell's 1955 effort to break a water speed record on Lake Mead in Nevada, US.

In 1966, Kalser admitted that Crashing the Water Barrier was produced by Marathon Petroleum as an advertisement.

Cast
 Knox Manning as Narrator
 Donald Campbell as Speedboat racer
 Sir Malcolm Campbell as Auto racer (archive footage) (uncredited)
 Narration: Jay Jackson

References

External links

1956 films
1956 documentary films
1956 short films
1950s short documentary films
American sports documentary films
Live Action Short Film Academy Award winners
Warner Bros. short films
Documentary films about water transport
Motorboat racing
Documentary films about Nevada
Lake Mead
1950s English-language films
1950s American films